Bhaji on the Beach  is a 1993 British comedy-drama film directed by Gurinder Chadha (in her feature film directorial debut) and written by Meera Syal.

Plot 
A community group of British women (mostly Punjabis of various faiths) of different generations, take a group day out to the Blackpool Illuminations. The tensions of the generation gap torn between tradition and modernism as well as the personal upsets and issues of the women and girls come to boiling point as they spend the day out.

Simi, the head of the group, has modern social beliefs about feminism that the older club women object to, however she manages to be the caring, in-control figure who holds the day together despite tensions. Ginder is escaping from her abusive criminal husband with her young son and fighting the stigma of being a single parent and her son's pleas to have both a mother and father again; unbeknownst to them is the fact that her husband and his brothers have tracked them to Blackpool. Two boy-crazy teenage girls meet with the disapproval of the conservative older ladies, and Simi after they meet up with a pair of American-themed burger bar employees after their shift ends. Hashida is a high flying student who is about to start medical school, yet would prefer to be studying painting. She has hidden her Afro-Caribbean boyfriend Oliver from her family for a year, but now she's pregnant by him and now they must decide about the child and their relationship, fearing that it would not stand the strain of social disapproval. Asha, a devout Hindu and Bollywood-cinema fan, is stuck with a humdrum life in her convenience shop and finds excitement and a sense of fulfilling missed opportunities in life with a charming, eccentric, artistic English actor in Blackpool, yet feels she must stay in her marriage; she experiences frequent Bollywood-themed hallucinations and day-dreams.

In the end, most of the characters have their stories left open. We do not see what happens to Asha or Oliver and Hashida and the final scenes of these characters seem quite content but open-ended. Ginder and her son escape the violence of her husband after one of his brothers rebells against him, having been pulled away from his own wife and derided for his loving marriage, and the most conservative characters receive a humorous treatment in a strip club.

Cast
 Zohra Sehgal as Pushpa
 Shaheen Khan as Simi
 Kim Vithana as Ginder
 Jimmi Harkishin as Ranjit
 Sarita Khajuria as Hashida
 Mo Sesayn as Oliver
 Rudolph Walker as Oliver's father
 Lalita Ahmed as Asha
 Amer Chadha-Patel as Amrik
 Nisha Nayar as Ladhu
 Renu Kochar as Madhu
 Surendra Kochur as Bina
 Souad Faress as Rekha
 Tanveer Chani as Balbir
 Bharti Patel as Refuge Woman
 Dane Power as Man on Street

Reception
In a review, Sight & Sound commented that Bhaji on the Beach "offered some trenchant observations about prevalent prejudices and what the younger, British-born generation of Asians had to offer. In Bhaji on the Beach, her feature film debut, Chadha has tried to adhere to this code of Buzurgh loyalty  (the age span ranges from 6 to the late 60s), while trying to encompass the more awkward and raw elements thrown up by contemporary Asian women's lives."
Rotten Tomatoes retrospectively collected reviews from 48 critics to give the film a score of 88%.

Year-end lists 
 Honorable mention – Kenneth Turan, Los Angeles Times

References

Bibliography

 Travelling bodies:Gender, Nationalism and Diasporic Identity Banerjee Bidisha Asian Cinema V20 n 2 Autumn–Wintwer 2009
 Cultural difference and exchange: a future for European Film. Eleftheriotis, Dimitris. Screen V41 n 1 Spring 2000.
 Representing the space of diaspora in contemporary cinema. Ciecko, Anne. Cinema JOurnal, v38 n3 Spring 1999
 No title. O'Neill, Eithne, Positif n447 May 1998
Mendes, AC. “Triangulating Birmingham, Blackpool, Bombay: Gurinder Chadha’s Bhaji on the Beach”, Anglo Saxonica, III.1, 325–336.

External links
 

1993 films
1993 comedy-drama films
British comedy-drama films
British Indian films
Films directed by Gurinder Chadha
Films set in Blackpool
Films about women in the Indian diaspora
Films set on beaches
Film4 Productions films
1993 directorial debut films
Picnic films
1990s English-language films
1990s British films